Nikos Badimas (born 16 December 1974) is a Greek professional football manager and former player.

Career

Playing career
As a player, Badimas started from the infrastructure segments of Panionios, where he played for the U−19 squad. He then spent the rest of his playing career with P.A.O. Rouf, Foinikas Kallithea, A.O. Terpsithea, Charavgiakos, Thriamvos and AO Trachones.

Coaching career
Badimas began his coaching career in Kaisariani, followed by Dafni Palaio Faliro and AO Terpsithea. In 2016 he took over PAS Giannina U−17 with whom he reached the Final-4 in the Greek U−17 championship. In 2019, he was appointed assistant to PAS Giannina head coach Argiris Giannikis, while simultaneously serving as the Technical Director of the club's infrastructure departments, as well as the head coach of the U−19 squad.

In June 2021, Badimas was hired as manager of Super League 2 club Ergotelis.
In August 2022, Badimas was hired as manager of  Kozani.

References

1974 births
Living people
Greek football managers
Ergotelis F.C. managers
Kozani F.C. managers
Association footballers not categorized by position
Footballers from Athens
Greek footballers